Belgrade Bus Station is the main bus station in Belgrade, Serbia. Located in Savski Venac, the bus station is composed by a bus depot and two bus terminals.

It is the main hub for intercity bus line Lasta Beograd. It is operated by BAS Beogradska autobuska stanica a.d.
A new station is under construction in New Belgrade, while the old one will be demolished.

References

Buildings and structures in Belgrade
Bus stations in Serbia
Transport in Belgrade
Savski Venac
Transport infrastructure completed in 1966
1966 establishments in Yugoslavia